is an EP released by Japanese rock band The Gazette on August 3, 2005. The first press edition came in a digipack form.

Track listing

Notes
Gama was re-released in 2005
The music video for "COCKROACH" was released long after the release of Gama on the Film Bug 1 music video collection.

References

The Gazette (band) albums
2005 EPs